The Grey is the third EP by American metal band Agalloch. It was released by Vendlus Records on February 29, 2004, in a limited run of 1,000 copies. The two songs on The Grey are reinterpretations of two tracks from The Mantle album. This EP is part of a dichotomy, completed by The White EP.

Track listing

Line-up 
 John Haughm – guitar, drums
 Don Anderson – guitars, piano
 Chris Greene – drums
 Jason William Walton – bass

References

External links 
 
 Vendlus Records

Agalloch albums
2004 EPs